Xinpu (formerly transliterated as Hsinpu Station until 2003) is a metro station in New Taipei, Taiwan served by Taipei Metro. It is an out-of-station interchange with Xinpu Minsheng station on the Circular line, which is 250 meters away.

Station overview

This two-level, underground station has an island platform and four exits. It is an out-of-station interchange with Xinpu Minsheng station on the Circular line, which is 250 meters away.

Because the Circular line was originally planned to make a regular interchange within Xinpu station, Xinpu station adapts a concourse design similar to that of Zhongxiao Fuxing station. However, after considering that the Circular line could benefit a lot more if it set up a station at Banqiao on the Bannan line, giving the ability to also transfer to TRA, THSR and long-distance buses, it was decided that the Circular line set up Banqiao station, which has caused the two out-of-station interchanges at Banqiao and Xinpu/Xinpu Minsheng.

History
31 August 2000: Opened for service with the opening of the segment between Jiangzicui and Xinpu.
31 May 2006: Service is extended through to Fuzhong, thus joining with the Tucheng line.

Station layout

Exits
Exit 1: Intersection of Wenhua Rd. Sec. 1 and Minsheng Rd. Sec. 3, beside the Xinpu Market
Exit 2: Intersection of Wenhua Rd. Sec. 1 and Minsheng Rd. Sec. 2, beside the Forward Hotel
Exit 3: Intersection of Wenhua Rd. Sec. 2 and Minsheng Rd. 2, beside the King building towards Zhuangjing & Huajiang parks
Exit 4: Intersection of Wenhua Rd. Sec. 2 and Minsheng Rd. Sec. 2 
Exit 5: Intersection of Wenhua Rd. Sec. 2 and Minsheng Rd. Sec. 3, beside the Far Eastern International Bank

Around the station
Chihlee University of Technology
Banciao Weekend Flower Market
New Taipei City Arts Center
Xinpu Market
New Taipei City Council (between this station and Jiangzicui station)
New Taipei City Library
Xinpu Elementary School
Juguang Elementary School
Jiangcui Junior High School
Zhongshan Junior High School
Siwei Park
Zhuangjing Park
Huajiang Park
Provincial Highway No. 3
Provincial Highway No. 64

References

Railway stations opened in 2000
Bannan line stations
Banqiao District